Hemmatabad-e Olya (also Romanized as Hemmatābād-e ‘Olyā; also known as Hemmatābād-e Bālā) is a village in Takab Rural District, Shahdad District, Kerman County, Kerman Province, Iran. At the 2006 census, its population was 317, in 74 families.

References 

Populated places in Kerman County